Nikoleta 'Nikol' Kyriakopoulou (born 21 March 1986) is a Greek pole vaulter. Nikoleta was 8th at the Olympic Games in Tokyo 2021. She also won the bronze medal at the World Championships in Beijing in 2015 jumping 4.80m. 
During the 2015 season, she set five Greek records (indoor and outdoor) raising the bar to 4,83 meters. The same year, she became the first Greek athlete to win the IAAF Diamond League.

Her first success in a major event was in 2012 when she won the bronze medal at the European Championships in Helsinki. One year earlier, in 2011, she finished 8th at the IAAF World Championships in Daegu. She also won the 2009 Mediterranean Games with a Games record of 4.50 meters, while as a junior athlete she was 6th at the World Championships in Grosseto in 2004.

Nikoleta did not compete in 2016 Rio Olympics due to injury.

In 2017 she became a mother of a baby girl and announced her return to competition for 2018. She won the silver medal at the 2018 European Championships and bronze medal at the European Championships in Glasgow in 2019.

International competitions

Personal bests

Personal life 

Nikoleta is married and has a daughter. She partially hailed from Emmanouil Pappas, Serres.

References

1986 births
Living people
Athletes from Athens
Greek female pole vaulters
Olympic athletes of Greece
Athletes (track and field) at the 2008 Summer Olympics
Athletes (track and field) at the 2012 Summer Olympics
World Athletics Championships athletes for Greece
World Athletics Championships medalists
European Athletics Championships medalists
Athletes (track and field) at the 2009 Mediterranean Games
Athletes (track and field) at the 2018 Mediterranean Games
Mediterranean Games gold medalists for Greece
Mediterranean Games bronze medalists for Greece
Mediterranean Games medalists in athletics
Diamond League winners
Competitors at the 2007 Summer Universiade
Athletes (track and field) at the 2020 Summer Olympics
20th-century Greek women
21st-century Greek women